In Greek mythology, the lotus-eaters were a race of people living on an island dominated by the lotus tree, a plant whose botanical identity is uncertain.  The lotus fruits and flowers were the primary food of the island and were a narcotic, causing the inhabitants to sleep in peaceful apathy. After they ate the lotus, they would forget their home and loved ones, and only long to stay with their fellow lotus-eaters. Those who ate the plant never cared to report, nor return.

Figuratively, 'lotus-eater' denotes "a person who spends their time indulging in pleasure and luxury rather than dealing with practical concerns".

Etymology
In English, the lotus-eaters (lōtophágoi), are also referred to as the lotophagi or lotophaguses (singular lotophagus ) or lotophages (singular lotophage ).

Mythology

In Homer’s epic poem the Odyssey Book IX, Odysseus tells how adverse north winds blew him and his men off course as they were rounding Cape Malea, the southernmost tip of the Peloponnesus, headed westwards for Ithaca:

Location 
Herodotus, in the fifth century BC, was sure that they still existed in his day, in coastal Libya:

Polybius identifies the land of the lotus-eaters as the island of Djerba (ancient Meninx), off the coast of Tunisia. Later, this identification is supported by Strabo. Pseudo-Scylax mentions lotus-eaters in area of northern and central Dalmatia ("namely the Iaderatenai and Boulinoi").

Lotus plant 
Because the Greek word λωτός : lōtós can refer to several different plants, there is some ambiguity as to which "lotus" appears in the Odyssey. Some of the proposed species, based in part on Herodotus' assertion, include:
Marijuana is considered to be the lotus flower described by the Odyssey because of the psychoactive effects of the cannabis plant when ingested.
 a fodder plant such as a species of Trifolium, Melilot or Trigonella, the Lotus corniculatus, the fellbloom, or Medicago arborea 
 the sweet and succulent persimmon fruit of the date-plum Diospyros lotus
 a water-lily, either Nymphaea lotus, Nymphaea caerulea, or Nymphaea stellata. Recent studies have shown that the blue water-lily of the Nile, Nymphaea caerulea, also known as the "blue lotus" (already known under this name to the Greeks), is another candidate. It can be processed for use as a soporific and, in some formulations, has psychotropic properties.  It is common in Egyptian iconography which suggests its use in a religious context.
 the nettle-tree, Celtis australis
 Ziziphus lotus, a relative of the jujube

It is the last of these, or another member of the genus Ziziphus, that is traditionally taken to be the plant meant in the Odyssey.

In popular culture
The British romantic composer Edward Elgar set to music the first stanza of the "Choric Song" portion of Tennyson's poem The Lotos-Eaters for a cappella choir in 1907-8. The work, "There is Sweet Music" (op. 53, no. 1), is a quasi double choir work, in which the female choir responds the male choir in a different tonality. Another British romantic composer, Hubert Parry, wrote a half-hour-long choral setting of Tennyson's poem for soprano, choir, and orchestra. 

In the song "Blown Away" by Youth Brigade, lines from the poem are used, such as "Death is the end of life; ah, why/Should life all labour be?/Let us alone. Time driveth onward fast" and "let us alone; what pleasure can we have to war with evil? is there any peace". The poem inspired, in part, the R.E.M. song "Lotus". "There’s the great English poem about the lotus eaters, who sit by the river and — I guess it’s supposed to be about opium — never are involved in life. Maybe there’s a bit of that in there," said Peter Buck. This song was released as the second single from R.E.M.'s eleventh studio album, Up (1998), and its recurring line "I ate the lotus" appeared also in an alternate form ("I'll eat the lotus...") in the song "Be Mine", from their tenth studio album New Adventures in Hi-Fi (1996).

In the book "Percy Jackson and the Olympians: The Lightning Thief" by Rick Riordan and the novel's movie adaptation, the three protagonists find themselves in the Lotus Hotel and Casino, in which they must escape from forgetting everything about themselves, Annabeth states "Of course! It was the lair of the lotus-eaters, they've been trapping mortals since ancient times."

In the 1978 film Revenge of the Pink Panther Valerie Leon plays a character named "Tanya - The Lotus Eater", which is presumably due to the fact that Clouseau's apartment has been turned into a brothel by Kato (hence referring to the pleasure aspect of the Lotus Eater term).

In episode 5 of HBO's series The White Lotus, Armond recites Choric Song IV of Tennyson's poem. The episode is named "The Lotus-Eaters". 

In episode 3 of the first season of the Showtime series Californication, Hank Moody refers to LA or California as the land of the lotus eaters, reflecting on how the place lets one languish, lose track of time, and neglect relationships.“Good morning, Hell-A. In the land of the lotus-eaters, time plays tricks on you. One day you’re dreaming, the next, your dream has become your reality. It was the best of times. If only someone had told me. Mistakes were made, hearts were broken, harsh lessons learned. My family goes on without me, while I drown in a sea of pointless pussy. I don’t know how I got here. But here I am, rotting away in the warm California sun. There are things I need to figure out, for her sake, at least. The clock is ticking. The gap is widening. She won’t always love me “no matter what.”  

A song called “Lotus Eater” appears on the Foster The People album Sacred Hearts Club.

A song called “Night of the Lotus Eaters” appears on the Nick Cave album Dig, Lazarus, Dig!!!.

In the 2011 movie Tinker Tailor Soldier Spy, based on the 1974 spy novel by John le Carré, when describing what happened to Jim Prideaux (Mark Strong) on his return to England after capture by the Russians, it is said that Jim was given an Alvis car and money, and was now just a "Lotus Eater".

See also
 The Lotos-Eaters – poem by Alfred, Lord Tennyson

References 

Geography of the Odyssey
Legendary tribes in Greco-Roman historiography
Ancient Libyans